The 2004 Georgia Tech Yellow Jackets football team represented the Georgia Institute of Technology in the 2004 NCAA Division I-A football season. The team's coach was former University of Florida quarterback Chan Gailey. It played its home games at Bobby Dodd Stadium in Atlanta.

Schedule

Coaching staff

 Chan Gailey – Head Coach
 Joe D'Alessandris – Offensive Line
 Buddy Geis – Wide Receivers/Assistant Head Coach
 Brian Jean-Mary – Linebackers
 Curtis Modkins – Running Backs
 Patrick Nix – Offensive Coordinator/Quarterbacks
 Tommie Robinson – Tight Ends
 Giff Smith – Defensive Line
 Jon Tenuta – Defensive Coordinator/Defensive Backs
 David Wilson – Special Teams/Recruiting Coordinator

References

Georgia Tech
Georgia Tech Yellow Jackets football seasons
Cheez-It Bowl champion seasons
Georgia Tech Yellow Jackets football